The Grime River is a river in northern New Guinea, in  Papua province, Indonesia.

The Nimboran languages are spoken in the Grime River watershed.

See also
List of rivers of Indonesia
List of rivers of Western New Guinea
Grime River languages

References

Rivers of Papua (province)